Abu al-Faraj is a title or given name, derived from the name Faraj, of Arabic origins. During the Middle Ages, the name Abu al-Faraj was a title for many Arab and Jewish poets and scholars. 

Notable people named Abu al-Faraj include:
Abu al-Faraj al-Isfahani (897–967), historian and author of Kitāb al-Aghānī
Abū al-Faraj ʿAbd Allāh ibn al-Ṭayyib (d. 1043), Nestorian physician and philosopher
Abu-al-Faraj ibn al-Jawzi (c.1126–1201), Islamic scholar of the Hanbali school of jurisprudential thought
Abu-al-Faraj Runi, 11th century Persian court poet who wrote Mathnavi
Athanasius VI bar Khamoro, a Syriac Patriarchs of Antioch
Bar-Hebraeus (1226–1286), also known as Abulpharagius, catholicos of the Syriac Orthodox Church
Jeshua ben Judah, also known as Abu al-Faraj Harun, 11th century Karaite scholar, exegete and philosopher
Abu Faraj al-Masri, a senior leader in the Syrian militant group Jabhat Fateh al-Sham
Ibn Rajab, Hanbali Muslim scholar
Abu Faraj al-Libbi, nom de guerre of a Libyan alleged to be a senior member of al-Qaeda

See also 

 Farag
 Faraj

References 

 

Arabic masculine given names
Jewish masculine given names
Iranian masculine given names